Natixis Investment Managers is an American French-based global asset management company that claims USD $1389.7 billion in assets under management as of December 31, 2020. The company has headquarters in Paris and Boston and it is the second biggest French manager by market share.  Its clients are institutional investors, companies, private banks, distributors (multi-managers and financial advisers) and banking networks.  The company is part of the French Natixis financial group.

History 
Natixis Global Asset Management was created in 2007, through the merger between Natixis Asset Management and Ixis Asset Management.  The company was renamed in November 2017 to Natixis Investment Managers to better highlight its multi-affiliate business model.

The original company was the asset management company of the Banque Populaire group; Ixis, founded in 1984 which was merged with the asset management company of the Caisse d’Epargne group.

Investment Managers 
The following investment managers operate under Natixis Investment Managers:

 AEW Capital Management
 AlphaSimplex Group
 Flexstone Partners
 Gateway Investment Advisers
 Harris Associates
 Loomis, Sayles & Company
 Mirova
 Natixis Investment Managers Solutions
 Vaughan Nelson
 WCM Investment Management

References

External links 
Natixis Investment Managers

Financial services companies established in 2007
Investment management companies of France